Segunda División de Panamá also known as Liga Prom, is a professional league for association football clubs in Panamá. It is the country's second-tier football competition, contested by 24 clubs with no promotion or relegation. The competition was formed on 2021.

History

ANAPROF ERA
The Anaprof era is remembered for establishing the Primera A branding with a format of two short tournaments per season (Apertura and Clausura), similar to many Latin American championships. Champions teams required promotional playoff games with ANAPROF's (top-tier league) last placed team.

LNA ERA

The Liga Nacional de Ascenso was formed in 2009 to replace the governing body of the league and forced ANAPROF top tier league to accept a direct promotion team. Other important goals were league expansion to 16 teams, later reduced to 14 teams after the 2011-12 season. The league was successful with attendance records since had several popular teams like Río Abajo FC, C.A. Independiente, SUNTRACS FC and Atlético Nacional. This severely affected ANAPROF and LPF (top-tier league) attendance numbers and reputation.

LPF ERA

The Ascenso LPF (2016-2020) era organised by Panamanian Football Federation was mostly remembered for reducing participating teams to eight and disaffiliating several teams for missing documentation and requirements.

Liga PROM
After Manuel Arias winning the Panamanian Football Federation election, the General Board accepted his proposal for a mew structure for the panamanian football at all levels starting 2021; for the second division tier, will have a 24 teams league named Liga PROM, with promotion and relegation suspended, added 12 LPF Under-20 teams, kept 7 remaining Ascenso LPF teams and invited 5 teams.

Teams 
The following teams are expected to play in the Liga Prom Apertura 2021 season.

Notes

Media coverage
The LPF has been partnered with local cable sports network Cableonda Sports (subsidiary of Tigo Panamá) to broadcast live games on the Cableonda tv cable system. In addition all teams are authorize to produce live streaming broadcasts using YouTube platform with no home or away matches restrictions, however is required to add Liga Prom logo and grant copyright to the LPF organization.

Champions

See also 
 Liga Panameña de Fútbol
 Panamanian Football Federation

References 

Liga Nacional de Ascenso
2

Panamá